Ryders Alley Trencher-fed Society (R.A.T.S.) is a New York City group founded in the 1990s that conducts organized rat hunting with dogs. The group was named by founding member Richard Reynolds after Ryders Alley in Manhattan, which was once rat infested, and the trencher-fed pack assembled to hunt. The group often hunts in Lower Manhattan locations like Theatre Alley where garbage is accessible to vermin.

The group responds to calls from citizens, including homeless whom they call their "intelligence network". In 2017, New York City councilmember Eric Ulrich called upon the group to eradicate rats in Ozone Park, Queens and awarded them for their efforts. The dogs each received a "Vigilante Award" from the New York City Council, a dog bone, and beef jerky treats.

See also
Rats in New York City

References

Further reading

External links

, R.A.T.S. channel (2010)
 Mike Rowe on The Blaze (2016)
The Curious Incident of the Dog in the Nighttime. This American Life (ep. 596, 2016)

Clubs and societies in New York City
Organizations established in 1992
Dogs in the United States
1992 establishments in New York City